Felipe Quispe Huanca "Mallku" (Quechua language: "condor"), (22 August 1942 – 19 January 2021) was a Bolivian historian and political leader. He headed the Pachakuti Indigenous Movement (MIP) and was general secretary of the United Union Confederation of Working Peasants of Bolivia (CSUTCB).

Biography 
Quispe founded the Tupak Katari Indian Movement in 1979 and the Tupak Katari Guerrilla Army in 1990.  His honorific name, Mallku, refers to the spirit of the mountains that surround and protect the People, and therefore is the source of life. "Mallku" means "peak" both in geography and in hierarchy.

In 1984, he was one of the leading organisers of the Tupac Katari Guerrilla Army, a failed armed insurrection against the government. Quispe was arrested for his involvement in the movement on August 19, 1992. Quispe has worked for the establishment of a Tawantinsuyu republic — which would take the name "Collasuyu" — in the Aymara-majority regions of Bolivia.

Quispe was a staunch opponent of the neoliberal Washington consensus, and was also strongly against U.S.-led schemes toward coca eradication, which he sees as destroying a critical part of Aymara culture. He was involved heavily in the Bolivian Gas War.

Quispe ran a failed campaign in the 2005 presidential elections, which saw the victory of indigenous Evo Morales, leader of MAS (Movimiento al socialismo). Quispe was a vocal critic of Morales' government, characterising it as representing "neoliberalism with an Indian face".

Quispe died on 19 January 2021 in El Alto from cardiac arrest.

References

Bibliography

External links
El Mallku Speaks: Indigenous Autonomy & Coca - The Narco News Interview with Felipe Quispe
In Defense of Life and Democracy

1942 births
2021 deaths
21st-century Bolivian politicians
Bolivian exiles
Bolivian expatriates in Cuba
Bolivian expatriates in El Salvador
Bolivian expatriates in Guatemala
Bolivian expatriates in Mexico
Bolivian expatriates in Peru
Bolivian guerrillas
20th-century Bolivian historians
Bolivian people of Aymara descent
Bolivian trade union leaders
Candidates in the 2002 Bolivian presidential election
Candidates in the 2005 Bolivian presidential election
Higher University of San Andrés alumni
Indigenous activists of the Americas
Jallalla La Paz politicians
Members of the Chamber of Deputies (Bolivia)
Pachakuti Indigenous Movement politicians
People from Omasuyos Province